Craig Hawkins is a Welsh rugby union player. He has previously played for Pro14 team Scarlets before leaving in 2013. He most recently played for Llanelli RFC. His usual position is hooker.

References 

Welsh rugby union players
Scarlets players
1979 births
Living people
Rugby union hookers